Sarmil (also Romanized as Sarmīl, Sar-e Mīl, and Sar-i-Mil; also known as Sar-e Mīl-e Soflá and Shīrīnābād) is a village in Howmeh-ye Kerend Rural District, in the Central District of Dalahu County, Kermanshah Province, Iran. At the 2006 census, its population was 104, in 23 families.

References 

Populated places in Dalahu County